Mpisi is a town in central Eswatini. It is located on the MR5 route to the northeast of Manzini, between the towns of Mafutseni and Luve.

References
Fitzpatrick, M., Blond, B., Pitcher, G., Richmond, S., and Warren, M. (2004)  South Africa, Lesotho and Swaziland. Footscray, VIC: Lonely Planet.

Populated places in Manzini Region